The 1990 Prague Skate was an international figure skating competition organized in Czechoslovakia. Medals were awarded in the disciplines of ladies' singles, pair skating and ice dancing. The men's singles event was cancelled after the withdrawal of several participants.

Ladies

Pairs

Ice dancing

References

1990
Prague Skate